Win Aung or Winn Aung is a Burmese name and may mean:

 Win Aung (businessman), Burmese businessman
 Win Aung (minister), Burmese military officer and politician who served as the 17th Minister of Foreign Affairs from 1998 to 2004
 Win Aung (politician, born 1974), current Pyithu Hluttaw MP for Momauk Township Constituency
 Win Aung (politician, born 1965), current Amyotha Hluttaw MP for Sagaing Region № 3 Constituency
 Winn Aung (MP), current Pyithu Hluttaw MP for Khin-U Township Constituency
 Han Win Aung, a footballer from Myanmar
 Thet Win Aung, (27 August 1971 – 16 October 2006), a Burmese student activist
 Tin Win Aung, a footballer from Myanmar
 Ye Win Aung, a footballer from Myanmar